Katrin Schmidt (born 28 September 1967) is a German badminton player, born in Langenhagen.

Schmidt competed in women's singles and women's doubles at the 1992 Summer Olympics in Barcelona, and in women's doubles at the 1996 Summer Olympics in Atlanta.

References

External links

1967 births
Living people
German female badminton players
Olympic badminton players of Germany
Badminton players at the 1992 Summer Olympics
Badminton players at the 1996 Summer Olympics
People from Hanover Region
Sportspeople from Lower Saxony